The Samoa women's national under-18 volleyball team represents Samoa in women's under-18 volleyball events. It is controlled and managed by the Samoa Volleyball Federation (SVF) that is a member of Asian volleyball body Asian Volleyball Confederation (AVC) and the international volleyball body government the Fédération Internationale de Volleyball (FIVB).

Team

Coaching staff

Current squad

Competition history

Youth Olympic Games
  2010 – Did not enter

World Championship
 1989 – Did not qualify
 1991 – Did not qualify
 1993 – Did not qualify
 1995 – Did not qualify
 1997 – Did not enter
 1999 – Did not enter
 2001 – Did not enter
 2003 – Did not enter
 2005 – Did not enter
 2007 – Did not enter
 2009 – Did not enter
 2011 – Did not enter
 2013 – Did not enter
 2015 – Did not enter
 2017 – Did not qualify
 2019 – Did not enter

Asian Championship
 1997 – Did not enter
 1999 – Did not enter
 2001 – Did not enter
 2003 – Did not enter
 2005 – Did not enter
 2007 – Did not enter
 2008 – Did not enter
 2010 – Did not enter
 2012 – Did not enter
 2014 – Did not enter
 2017 – 11th
 2018 – Did not enter

External links
Official fanpage

volleyball
Women's volleyball in Samoa
National women's under-18 volleyball teams